Andrea Belluzzi (born 23 March 1968) is a Sammarinese politician who served as a Captain Regent with Roberto Venturini, from April to October 2015. He was previously a member of the Grand and General Council. He works as a lawyer, is married, and has a son.

References

1968 births
Captains Regent of San Marino
Members of the Grand and General Council
Living people
Party of Socialists and Democrats politicians
Sammarinese lawyers